Sabine Letícia Heitling (born 2 July 1987, in Santa Cruz do Sul) is Brazilian athlete specializing in the 3000 metres steeplechase.

Biography
Heitling's personal best in the event is 9:41.22 achieved in 2009 in London. This was the Brazilian and South American record on the steeplechase until 2016, when Juliana Paula dos Santos ran 3 seconds faster.

In 2013, Heitling tested positive for a banned stimulant Methylhexaneamine and was disqualified for 1 year. The ban lasted from 7 June 2013 to 6 June 2014.

Competition record

References

External links
 

1987 births
Living people
Brazilian female middle-distance runners
Brazilian female steeplechase runners
Athletes (track and field) at the 2007 Pan American Games
Athletes (track and field) at the 2011 Pan American Games
People from Santa Cruz do Sul
Doping cases in athletics
Brazilian sportspeople in doping cases
Pan American Games medalists in athletics (track and field)
Pan American Games gold medalists for Brazil
Pan American Games bronze medalists for Brazil
South American Games gold medalists for Brazil
South American Games silver medalists for Brazil
South American Games bronze medalists for Brazil
South American Games medalists in athletics
Competitors at the 2002 South American Games
Competitors at the 2006 South American Games
Competitors at the 2011 Summer Universiade
Medalists at the 2007 Pan American Games
Medalists at the 2011 Pan American Games
Sportspeople from Rio Grande do Sul
20th-century Brazilian women
21st-century Brazilian women